Beechy is a village in the Canadian province of Saskatchewan within the Rural Municipality of Victory No. 226 and Census Division No. 7. The village is located in the Coteau Hills region of the province, at the intersection of Highway 342 and Highway 737.  As of 2006, the village's population is 243 (down from the 2001 population of 295).

History 
 
The Beechy area was first settled by ranchers early in the 20th century, with Robert Cruikshank acknowledged as the first settler in the area.  Starting in the 1910s, the large-scale immigration of Europeans to the Canadian prairies resulted in an increase in population for Beechy as well, attracting settlers who started ranching and farming in the area, which remains Beechy's primary activity today.

In 1919 the Canadian National Railway surveyed the Beechy area and determined it to be an ideal place for a marketplace.  Work on the railroad was begun; news of the future railroad stop attracted merchants.  The train first arrived on December 21, 1921.

The growth in population brought other much-needed services to this rural community, the first grain elevator was constructed in 1922. Beechy incorporated as a village on May 11, 1925.

Climate

Demographics 

Recreation 

One of the first baseball teams in the area was formed in Beechy in 1911.  Baseball is still played in the village today by the Beechy Breakers.

Beechy's first organized hockey team played during the winter of 1935-1936.  After World War II, those Beechy residents who served overseas, which included the entire hockey team, returned to Beechy and created the Beechy Bombers hockey team.  The first skating rink was built in 1952.

The first agricultural fair was held in the area in 1922.  The agricultural society was organized in 1936 and granted its charter in 1945.  The first racetrack was built in 1948, and the following year the first harness races were held.

The community hall was built in 2000, replacing the much older Legion Hall which was demolished and replaced with a monument.

The biggest event in Beechy is the Beechy Western Days rodeo, first held in 1968.

Attractions 

In south west Beechy, scenic giant sandcastles have formed due to many years of wind and rain erosion and from the subterranean collapse. This extraordinary site debunks the stereotype that Saskatchewan only has flat land.

Infrastructure 
Health care
Originally, Beechy's health services consisted of just one medical practitioner, and the "hospital" was based out of a private residence, with extra rooms built on for wards. This hospital was used until 1966, when the Beechy Union Hospital was opened. In 1991, the Beechy Union Hospital was closed by the provincial government and the building now serves as a clinic.

Education 
Schoolchildren in the RM of Victory No. 226 are bussed to Beechy for their education.

Notable residents 

 Elwin Hermanson - politician; represented Beechy on the federal level as the Member of Parliament for Kindersley—Lloydminster; Reform Party House Leader; then represented the area provincially, becoming the first leader of the Saskatchewan Party and Leader of the Opposition until 2003 when he relinquished the leadership
 Sharon MacFarlane - author of short story collection 'Driving Off The Map' (Hounslow Press, Toronto); 'The Lights of Home' (One Act Play Depot) and, with Glenda MacFarlane, the CBC Radio Drama 'The Antelope Season' (Morningside)
 Herbert J. Swan - politician; former Speaker of the Legislative Assembly of Saskatchewan

See also

 List of communities in Saskatchewan
 Villages of Saskatchewan

References

External links 

Villages in Saskatchewan
Victory No. 226, Saskatchewan
Division No. 7, Saskatchewan